Xavier Girard (born 1970) is a French nordic combined skier who competed from 1988 to 1992. He won a silver medal in the 3 x 10 km team event at the 1991 FIS Nordic World Ski Championships in Val di Fiemme.

Girard's best individual finish was 2nd in Canada in 1989.

External links

1970 births
Living people
French male Nordic combined skiers
Nordic combined skiers at the 1988 Winter Olympics
Nordic combined skiers at the 1992 Winter Olympics
Olympic Nordic combined skiers of France
FIS Nordic World Ski Championships medalists in Nordic combined